Robert Elliot Pollack is an American biologist whose interests cross many academic lines. He grew up in Brooklyn, attended public schools, and majored in physics at Columbia University, where he graduated from the College in 1961. He received a PhD in Biological Sciences from Brandeis University in 1966, and subsequently was a postdoctoral Fellow in Pathology with Howard Green at NYU Medical center, and at the Weizmann Institute in Israel with Ernest Winocour. He was then recruited to Cold Spring Harbor Laboratory by James Watson to establish a research program on reversion of cancer cells. He became a tenured Associate Professor of Microbiology at the Stony Brook University Medical Center before returning to Columbia as a Professor of Biological Sciences in 1978. He served as Dean of Columbia College from 1982 to 1989, overseeing the enrollment of women in the College for the first time. 

He remains at Columbia as a Professor of Biological Sciences, and also serves as Director of The University Seminars; he is the fifth Director since its founding in 1944.  He is also a member of the Affiliate Faculty of the American Studies Program. From 1999-2012, he was the Director of the Center for the Study of Science and Religion, a program within Columbia’s Earth Institute. In 2014 his interest in questions that lie at the intersection of science and subjectivity, coupled with the gift of an endowment from College alumnus Harvey Krueger ’51, led him to establish the Research Cluster on Science and Subjectivity, a project within Columbia’s Center for Science and Society. 

In addition to these activities, Pollack has authored many research reports, reviews, articles, and opinion pieces on molecular biology, medical ethics and science education. For the academic year 1993–1994 he was awarded a Guggenheim Fellowship in science writing. He has written or edited ten books, including Signs of Life: the Language and Meanings of DNA (1994), which won the Lionel Trilling Award and has been translated into six languages, The Faith of Biology and the Biology of Faith: Order, meaning and free will in modern science (2000), and The Missing Moment: How the unconscious shapes modern science (1999). His most recent book is The Course of Nature, a book of drawings by the artist Amy Pollack, accompanied by his short explanatory essays.

References

External links
Curriculum Vitae
Research Cluster on Science and Society
The University Seminars at Columbia University

Jewish American scientists
Brandeis University alumni
Columbia College (New York) alumni
Columbia University faculty
Fellows of the American Association for the Advancement of Science
History of biotechnology
New York University faculty
Place of birth missing (living people)
Living people
21st-century American biologists
People from Brooklyn
Scientists from New York (state)
Jewish American academics
Jewish biologists
1940 births